The Khalifeh family, also known as the Khalifeh sayyids, were a branch of the Marashi dynasty of Mazandaran, whose ancestor, Amir Nezam al-Din, had settled in the Golbar quarter of Isfahan in the 15th century.

Even though the Khalifeh family was renowned as being descendants of the celebrated Marashi ruler Mir-i Buzurg (r. 1359–1362), they first became one of the leading families of Isfahan in the late 16th century. But they were still affluent and distinguished enough to intermarry with local well-known families. According to the Safavid court historian Iskandar Munshi, "The Khalifeh family had held estates in the Isfahan area for generations."

References

Sources